Derek Tsang Kwok-cheung (born 8 November 1979) is a Hong Kong film director and actor. The son of actor Eric Tsang, Tsang got his start in the Hong Kong film industry working for director Peter Chan Ho-Sun after graduating from University of Toronto Scarborough in 2001. He made his acting debut in Men Suddenly in Black (2003) and directorial debut with Lover's Discourse (2010), sharing the directing credit with Jimmy Wan Chi-man. The duo was nominated for a Golden Horse Award for Best New Director in 2010.

His solo directorial debut Soul Mate (2016) was critically praised, receiving a Hong Kong Film Award for Best Film nomination at the 36th Hong Kong Film Awards. His next film Better Days (2019) was the Hong Kong submission for the Academy Awards and received a Best International Feature Film nomination, becoming the first Hong Kong submission directed by a Hong Kong native to do so.

Early life
Derek Tsang was born to actor Eric Tsang and his second wife Rebecca Chu in Hong Kong on 8 November 1979. 

Tsang described his upbringing as mostly detached from his father's public limelight. He said his father had moved out to live on his own when Tsang was a child because he had wanted to keep his personal life separate from the entertainment industry, which allowed Tsang "an ordinary, middle-class upbringing". Tsang lived with his mother, grandmother, and younger brother Mark in Mei Foo Sun Chuen before the family, excluding his father, moved to Canada when Tsang was 11.

Tsang received his bachelor of arts in Sociology at the University of Toronto Scarborough in 2001.

Career 
After graduation, he moved back to Hong Kong, where his father arranged for him to work under director Peter Chan Ho-Sun. There, he met producer Jojo Hui and director Jimmy Wan Chi-man, both of whom would go on to be Tsang's frequent collaborators.

Despite not pursuing an acting career, Tsang has had a variety of acting roles since the start of his career, which he attributed to other actors not wanting to be typecast into roles with unflattering characteristics. He made his screen debut in Men Suddenly in Black (2003), cameoing as the younger version of his father's character. There he met director Pang Ho-cheung, whom Tsang would later collaborate with on various projects.

Tsang made his solo directorial debut with Soul Mate (2016). He was subsequently nominated for Best Director awards at various film award ceremonies, including at the 36th Hong Kong Film Awards and the 53rd Golden Horse Awards.

His next film, Better Days (2019), won eight out of 12 categories at the 39th Hong Kong Film Awards, including Best Film and Best Director. The film was subsequently chosen as the official entry for Hong Kong for Best International Feature Film at the 93rd Academy Awards. It was shortlisted but lost to Denmark's Another Round. He was the first native Hong Kong director in the category.

Filmmaking 
Tsang said his influences are primarily derived from art-house cinema, with early influences from director Wong Kar-wai and the French New Wave, as opposed to his father Eric Tsang's works, which consisted of mostly of mainstream comedies. He credits his half sister Bowie Tsang for teaching him about film and literature.

Personal life
Tsang married actress Venus Wong in 2019. He has expressed a reluctance to cast Wong due to the negative perception of nepotism.

Filmography

Directing 

 Lover's Discourse (2010)
 Lacuna (2012)
 Soul Mate (2016)
 Better Days (2019)

Acting 

 The Strangled Truth (2019)
 Missbehavior (2019)
 The Brink (2017)
 Love Off the Cuff (2017)
 S Storm (2016)
 Robbery (2016)
 From Vegas to Macau III (2016)
 From Vegas to Macau II (2015)
 Zombie Fight Club (2014)
 Z Storm (2014)
 Naked Ambition 2 (2014)
 Golden Chicken 3 (2014)
 Streets of Macao (2014)
 SDU: Sex Duties Unit (2013)
 My Sassy Hubby (2012)
 Triad (2012)
 Love in the Buff (2012)
 The Thieves (2012)
 Girl$ (2010)
 Once a Gangster (2010)
 Dream Home (2010)
 Ex (2010) - Sol
 Claustrophobia (2008) - John
 Ocean Flame (2008)
 Scare 2 Die (2008)
 Run Papa Run (2008) - Chicken
 Tactical Unit: No Way Out (2008)
 Simply Actors (2007) - Window cleaner vendor
 Single Blog (2007) - Woody
 Dragon Boys' (2007) - Fox Boy (Canadian TV Miniseries)
 My Name Is Fame (2006)
 On the Edge (2006) - Mini B
 Midnight Running (2006) - Peter
 The Third Eye (2006) - Gum
 Without Words (2006) - Michael
 Isabella (2006) - Fai
 Cocktail (2006) - Kuen
 A.V. (2005) - Band-Aid
 It Had to Be You! (2005)
 The Eye 2 (2004) - Joey's co-worker
 The Park (2003) (as Derek Tsang) - Dan
 Men Suddenly in Black'' (2003) - Young Tin

Awards and nominations

References

External links
 
 Derek Tsang at hkmdb.com

1979 births
Living people
Hong Kong male film actors
Hong Kong film directors
Hong Kong screenwriters
People from Wuhua
Hong Kong people of Hakka descent
Male actors from Meizhou
Film directors from Guangdong
Writers from Meizhou
Chinese male film actors
Chinese film directors
University of Toronto alumni
Screenwriters from Guangdong